The Venerable  Paul Colin Hackwood  is a priest in the Church of England and currently a Canon Residentiary at Leicester Cathedral.

Hackwood was born in 1961 and educated at Birmingham University and the Bradford University School of Management. He was ordained in 1990. After a curacy at Little Horton he was the  Social Responsibility Advisor for the Diocese of St Albans from  1993 to 1997. Following this he became Vicar of Thornbury; and in 2005 Archdeacon of Loughborough, a post he held for four years.

Hackwood has four children; Tom, Sam, Olly and Bon.

Notes

1961 births
Alumni of the University of Birmingham
Alumni of the University of Bradford
Archdeacons of Loughborough
Living people